The 2019 European Short Course Swimming Championships took place in Glasgow, Scotland from 4 to 8 December 2019.

Medal table

Results

Men's events

Women's events

Mixed events

References

External links
Official website
Results
Results book

European Short Course Swimming Championships
2019 in swimming
European Short Course
Swimming in Scotland
International sports competitions in Glasgow
European Short Course
2010s in Glasgow